The Cuba–Haiti Maritime Boundary Agreement is a 1977 treaty between Cuba and Haiti which delimits the maritime boundary between the two countries.

Despite no official diplomatic relations at the time between the two countries, the treaty was signed in Havana on 27 October 1977. The text of the treaty sets out a boundary that is an approximate equidistant line between the two islands in the Windward Passage. The boundary consists of 50 straight-line maritime segments defined by 51 individual coordinate points. Navassa Island, which is off the west coast of Haiti and which is claimed by Haiti and by the United States, was disregarded in calculating the approximate equidistant line of the boundary. 

The treaty came into force on 6 January 1978 after it had been ratified by both countries. The full name of the treaty is Agreement between the Republic of Haiti and the Republic of Cuba Regarding the Delimitation of Maritime Boundaries between the Two States.

Notes

References
 Anderson, Ewan W. (2003). International Boundaries: A Geopolitical Atlas. Routledge: New York. ;  OCLC 54061586
 Charney, Jonathan I., David A. Colson, Robert W. Smith. (2005). International Maritime Boundaries, 5 vols. Hotei Publishing: Leiden. ; ; ; ; ;  OCLC 23254092

Treaties concluded in 1977
1977 in Cuba
1977 in Haiti
Boundary treaties
Cuba–Haiti border
Treaties of Cuba
Treaties of Haiti
Treaties entered into force in 1978
United Nations treaties